IDW may refer to: 

 IDW Publishing, a U.S. comic book publisher
 Informationsdienst Wissenschaft, a German science news service
 Institut der Wirtschaftsprüfer in Deutschland, a German non-profit organization serving public auditors
 Intellectual dark web, a loosely-defined philosophical neologism coined by Eric Weinstein
 Inverse distance weighting, a mathematical method for surface fitting
 Investigative Data Warehouse, an FBI surveillance database